Stanley L. Lebar (July 29, 1925 in Richmond, Virginia – December 23, 2009 in Baltimore, Maryland) was an American engineer who constructed the television cameras used during the Apollo program.

Biography
During World War II, Lebar served as a shooter with the Consolidated B-24 Liberator, then studied electrical engineering at the University of Missouri until 1950. In 1953, he joined Westinghouse Electric Corporation in Baltimore.

In 1964, Westinghouse was commissioned by NASA to develop a TV camera capable of withstanding the extreme temperatures of the Moon and weighing only seven pounds instead of the then 400 pounds. After five years, Lebar was the head of a team of 75 engineers and technicians and more than 300 manufacturers. This black-and-white camera finally transmitted the first steps of Neil Armstrong on the Moon during the television transmission of the Moon landing in 1969. Lebar's innovations to cameras affected technology as a whole.

Later, Lebar also developed a color television camera for the Apollo program, as well as the cameras for the Skylab space station.

For the successful development of this camera and the color television transmissions of the Apollo program, the company Westinghouse received an Emmy in the technology category, which Lebar accepted in 1970.

Lebar died at the age of 84 of complications from surgery.

References

External links
 NBC: Live From the Moon: Stan Lebar, Lunar TV Camera Creator Dies
 NASA: Passing of Stan Lebar
 The Sacramento Bee: A retired engineer is still working to improve the first TV images broadcast from Apollo 11
 The DV Show Podcast: An Interview With the Man Who Brought the First Moon Mission to Television 

1925 births
2009 deaths
Engineers from Virginia
People from Richmond, Virginia
People from Baltimore
20th-century American engineers
United States Army Air Forces personnel of World War II
University of Missouri alumni
United States Army Air Forces soldiers
Jewish American inventors
20th-century American Jews